Herbstmilch may refer to:

 Herbstmilch (novel), a 1985 autobiographical novel
 Herbstmilch (film), film based on the novel